Bernard Fournier (born 13 September 1946) is a French politician and a member of the Senate of France. He represents the Loire department and is a member of The Republicans Party.

Political career
In the Senate, Fournier is a member of the Committee on Foreign Affairs, Defense and the Armed Forces. He also chairs the French-Romanian Parliamentary Friendship Group.

In addition to his work in Parliament, Fournier has been serving as member of the French delegation to the Parliamentary Assembly of the Council of Europe since 2008. In this capacity, he is a member of the Committee on Migration, Refugees and Displaced Persons; the Sub-Committee on Co-operation with non European countries of origin and transit; and the Sub-Committee on Refugee and Migrant Children and Young People.

Political positions
Ahead of the 2022 presidential elections, Fournier publicly declared his support for Michel Barnier as the Republicans’ candidate.

References

Page on the Senate website

1946 births
Living people
Politicians from Saint-Étienne
French Senators of the Fifth Republic
Union for a Popular Movement politicians
Debout la France politicians
The Republicans (France) politicians
Senators of Loire (department)
Politicians from Auvergne-Rhône-Alpes